My First Kiss is a 2008 drama film, written and directed by David Wexler.

The short was an Official Selection of the Big Apple Film Festival, Silver Lei winner of the Honolulu International Film Festival, and nominated for Best Narrative Film at the Miami Short Film Festival.

Plot
Michelle films her boyfriend and asks questions about the first day they met. The narrative flashes back and forth from this 'present day' video log, to the nervous, and semi-awkward going-ons of the protagonist (Joey) getting ready for girls to come over to his house. Uncomfortable moments, embarrassing camp stories, and confrontations between drifting friends ensue... it feels like that first break back home from college.

References

External links
 

2000s English-language films